There are two rivers named Jauru River in Brazil:

 Jauru River (Mato Grosso do Sul)
 Jauru River (Mato Grosso)

See also 
 Jaru River, a river of Rondônia, Brazil
 Jauaru River, a river of Pará, Brazil
 Jauru, a city in Mato Grosso, Brazil